Delhi Public School (DPS), Bhagalpur, is a school in Bhagalpur, Bihar, India. It was  established in April 2006 as an English medium co-educational school affiliated to the Central Board of Secondary Education, New Delhi, India. The school is run jointly by the Delhi Public School Society and the Angika Development Society, a non-profit making society. Dr. Girish Chanwas the first principal of the school. Mrs. Arunima Chakraborty is the present Principal.The school motto is Where Dreams Meet Destination.

Facilities

Library
The school has library facilities in the building of the school. The facility is available to students of the school during the school hours. All classes from class I onwards are provided with at least one library period per week.

Computer centre
There are computer labs in the school. In the senior school all computers are interconnected with LAN and WLAN. Computer education is provided from class I onwards. Cyber Security Essentials taught by NSD, a Government of India supported organisation.

High speed (broadband) Internet and email facilities are available in the school. All students of classes VI to XII have access to these facilities. The School has wireless computer labs for ultimate experience of Internet World and Knowledge. The entire campus is on Wi-Fi enabled. Students can log on to network from any corner in campus through computer. Students can interact with their teachers through the Internet.

Laboratories
The school laboratories include physics lab, chemistry lab, biology lab, language lab, quiz lab, maths lab, audio – visual hall.

Games and sports
 The campus includes a full-sized playground with football field, cricket pitches for net practices, volleyball courts, basketball courts, kho-kho and kabaddi courts. There are sand-pits, swing, slides and see-saws for the primary students.
 There is a gymnasium for work-outs and exercises.
 Table tennis, billiards, chess and carom are available.
 The school has indoor badminton courts.
 A swimming pool has been built near hostel.

Transport
The school has its own Air-Conditioned buses and they are fitted with Toilet and T.V. All buses run on specified routes and covers the city area and the neighbouring areas.

Clinic
There are sick rooms in the school. A trained nurse attends to sick children and provides first aid in case of an emergency. An annual medical checkup of the students is done in the clinic.

References

External links
 

Delhi Public School Society
Schools in Bihar
Education in Bhagalpur district
Bhagalpur
Educational institutions established in 2006
2006 establishments in Bihar